PCPN may refer to:
 Permanent Committee on Place Names, a geographical naming agency
 Podkarpackie Centrum Piłki Nożnej, a football stadium in Stalowa Wola, Poland